Punjab Nahi Jaungi, is a 2017 Pakistani romantic comedy film directed by Nadeem Baig and written by Khalil-ur-Rehman Qamar. It stars Humayun Saeed and Mehwish Hayat alongside Sohail Ahmed, Saba Hameed and Urwa Hocane in povital roles. The story is about a love triangle, between the lead characters, and the film also exhibits the Punjabi culture of Pakistan. spin-off to the film titled, London Nahi Jaunga released to mixed reviews.

The film released  on Eid, 1 September, under the production banners of Humayun Saeed and Shahzad Nasib's Six Sigma Plus, and was distributed by Salman Iqbal and Jerjees Seja's ARY Films.

Plot
The film starts with Fawad Khagga (Humayun Saeed) returning to Faisalabad from Lahore after completing his M.A. Fawad wants to do love marriage with a beautiful girl. His cousin Durdana Butt (Urwa Hocane) loves him but he doesn't love her back. Fawad's mother Firdous Khagga likes Amal Dastoor (Mehwish Hayat) who has returned from London after studying economics. The   Fawad and Amal have 100 years old friendship. Firdous requests Fawad's grandfather Mehtab Khagga to ask Amal about marrying Fawad but she refuses because she wants to marry her college friend Vasay (Azfar Rehman) with whom she studied in London. After hearing that Amal has refused his proposal, a heartbroken Fawad goes to Karachi and tries to win her heart by telling her that he can give her his only property of Buffaloes and Dairy. She asks Vasay to give her his London apartment but he refuses because that's the only property he has with him. After hearing that Amal agrees to marry Fawad. On the day of marriage, Fawad gets drunk and tells his friends that he hasn't given Amal any property but has killed her by stucking her in sentiments. Amal hears this and gets heartbroken. Fawad tells Amal that whatever he said wasn't true, he was just showing off in front of his friends and asks for forgiveness. Amal tells him she will forgive him if he dives from the roof. Fawad dives from the roof but survives.
 
After Fawad recovers from his injuries, he takes Amal to his dairy but she doesn't feel happy after seeing the condition of dairy and buffaloes. She decides to renovate the dairy by importing a plant. Because of being busy in dairy's work, she is unable to give time to Fawad due to which Fawad gets heartbroken. He hugs his cousin Durdana and asks her to help him because his heart is broken. Amal sees him hugging Durdana and gets heartbroken and tells Fawad that she will take divorce from him after hearing this Fawad gets angry and slaps Amal after which she leaves him and goes back to Karachi. Now after some weeks, Fawad feels guilty and decides to go to Karachi and apologize to her but when he goes to her home. her family tells him that she has demanded divorce from him. After hearing this Fawad decides to meet Amal but she is gone at Vasay's house. He goes to Vasay's house and tries to take Amal with him. Vasay and his friends try to stop him but he beats them after which the police arrives and arrests Fawad. After getting released from jail, Fawad again tries to apologize to Amal but she doesn't forgive him and asks for divorce one final time otherwise they will meet in court. Fawad agrees to give her divorce only if she comes to Punjab at first she refuses. Fawad leaves but Vasay and his friends stop him. He allows Vasay to beat him. Amal than agrees to come to Punjab. Fawad apologizes to his and Amal's family after signing the divorce papers and leaves. Fawad is about to dive again from the roof but Amal stops him, forgives him, claiming that those were not divorce papers but a promise that they will love each other immensely and they embrace each other.
The film ends with Fawad and Amal hugging each other.

Cast
Humayun Saeed as Chaudhry Fawad Khagga
Sohail Ahmed as Mehtab Khagga
Mehwish Hayat as Amal Dastoor
Saba Hameed as Firdous Khagga
Naveed Shehzad as Bebo Ji aka Nikatara
Urwa Hocane as Durdana Butt
Ahmed Ali Butt as Shafique Ahmed
Waseem Abbas as Jawad Khagga
Azfar Rehman as Vasay 
Behroze Sabzwari as Dastoor Ahmed
Safina Sheikh as Mrs. Dastoor Ahmed
 Bashar Amir Shafi as Farhan (Dastoor's son) (child artist)
Adnan Shah Tipu as Shaukat Ali (cameo appearance)
Syed Mohammad Ahmed as a lawyer (special appearance)
Marina Khan (as a lady in the restaurant) (special appearance)
Fahad Rehmani (as a man in the restaurant) (special appearance)
Ushna Shah (special appearance in song "Raat Ka Nasha") 
 Muhammad Umer Jamal

Production

Development and casting
The film was a joint production between ARY Films and Humayun Saeed's production house Six Sigma Plus. The film also has renowned Pakistani television actors, such as Urwa Hocane, Ahmed Ali Butt, Saba Hameed, Sohail Ahmed, Azfar Rehman, Naveed Shehzad, Behroze Sabzwari, Safeena Sheikh, Samina Peerzada and Waseem Abbass.

Iman Ali was first chosen as the female lead but was replaced by Mehwish Hayat. However, Saeed later clarified that Iman Ali was never officially a part of the film and that they were just in talks, and that he and Iman Ali mutually agreed that she would not be cast in this film. Sohai Ali Abro was initially approached for Durdana's role which she refused to do. Talking about this, Saeed asserted, "We did approach Sohai for Urwa's role but she wasn't comfortable doing it. Maybe she expected a bigger role and this just wasn't delivering it."

Filming
The filming took place in the city of Faisalabad, while architectural masterpieces from Bahawalpur, like Darbar Mahal and Gulzar mahal were used in some of the scenes. Most of the filming took place in the cities of Faisalabad, Lahore and Karachi.

Release
The film's trailer was released online on 6 July 2017. Within 48 hours, it had over 1 million views and trended at number 1 on YouTube Pakistan for several days and has also crossed up to 6 million views till date.  The film released worldwide on the festival of Eid al-Adha, 1 September 2017. The film had a premiere event at Nuplex Cinema, Karachi, on 29 August 2017.

Reception

Box office
Punjab Nahi Jaungi recorded the biggest Single day for any Pakistani film with collecting . This record was broken by Jawani Phir Nahi Ani 2 soon, with collecting . The film crossed the  gross mark right after its opening extended weekend; on Tuesday, 5 September. It collected  within a week of its release. It became the first Pakistani film to cross  within ten days. An official report on 26 December said that it became the first Pakistani film to cross the  mark. It made a total gross of Rs 35.85 crores locally and Rs 15.80 crores from overseas with a worldwide total of Rs 51.65 crores.

It also reportedly left behind Bollywood film, Baadshaaho, at the UK box office with a record breaking collection. The domestic record was then broken by 2018 Indian film Sanju within its fourth weekend in Pakistan.

Critical reception
It received positive reviews from critics. Rahul Aijaz of The Express Tribune rated the film 4 out of 5 stars and said, "a fine line (in terms of story) between turning ridiculous and falling over, yet it somehow manages to keep its balance and not trip often". Hamna Zubair of DAWN Images  praised the performance of Saeed and also his chemistry with Hayat and said that the film's "comedy works", but when a "slap made an appearance... this act of violence... almost ruined" the film. Shahjehan Saleem of Something Haute rated the film 4 out of 5 stars and said that "the film soars high" because of "the cast's stellar job" and "the script", and it "is so much more than just another glitzy show of emotions".

Omair Alavi of Samaa TV rated the film 4 out of 5 stars, saying that it "has a message as well as entertainment value". However, he noted that the roles of Humayun Saeed and Ahmed Ali Butt were hard to accept. Mahwash Ajaz of Dunya News rated it 3.5 out of 5 stars praising the performances of Saeed, Hayat and Hocane and noted that the film may has "some fairly strong progressive storylines" but with some problems, while "The film's feel, the inside jokes, the heavily accented English, breathtaking cinematography,... tawdry finery, danceable songs, relatable comedy and the visual treat" all are "paisa vusool". Rabiya Maqbool writing for the website Bolo Jawan praised the performances of Saeed and Hocane, stating that the director "has succeeded once again in piecing together a film which is satisfyingly refreshing and a very welcome addition" to cinema. Momin Ali Munshi of Galaxy Lollywood rated the film 4 out of 5 stars and wrote, "It is the perfect family entertainer for you to enjoy in cinemas with your family and celebrate how far we have come in this new age  of cinema". He praised the performances of Saeed, Butt, Hocane and Hayat.

Accolades

Jury Special Award; first Shanghai Cooperation Organization (SCO) Film Festival in Qingdao, China

Soundtrack

The film soundtrack album was released by ARY Films in August 2017. It consists of seven songs composed by various artists. There is a single music video from film soundtrack directed by Parmesh Adiwal, titled "Rab Rakha", and featuring Farhan Saeed.

References

External links

2017 films
2017 romantic comedy films
Pakistani multilingual films
Pakistani romantic comedy films
Films shot in Karachi
Punjabi-language Pakistani films
2010s Urdu-language films
Films shot in Punjab, Pakistan
Six Sigma Plus
Films scored by Shani Arshad